The following were the events of gymnastics for the year 2017 throughout the world.

Acrobatic gymnastics
 March 1–5: FIG World Cup No. 1 in Maia
 Pair winners: Belgium (Kilian Goffaux & Robin Casse) (m) / Belgium (Noémie Lammertyn & Lore Vanden Berghe) (f)
 Group winners: Israel (Yannay Kalfa, Daniel Uralevitch, Lidar Dana, Efi Sach) (m) / Belarus (Julia Ivonchyk, Veronika Nabokina, Karina Sandovich) (f)
 Mixed pair winners: Russia (Elena Murashko & Ivan Nesterenko)
 April 7–9: FIG World Cup #2 in Puurs
 Pair winners: Belgium (Kilian Goffaux & Robin Casse) (m) / Belgium (Noémie Lammertyn & Lore Vanden Berghe) (f)
 Group winners: Great Britain (Conor Sawenko, Charlie Tate, Adam Upcott, Lewis Watts) (m) / Belarus (Julia Ivonchyk, Veronika Nabokina, Karina Sandovich) (f)
 Mixed pair winners: Portugal (Carolina Dias & Joao Martins)
 May 25–27: FIG World Cup #3 in Geneva
 Pair winners: Russia (Dmitry & Maksim Ivanov) (m) / China (MENG Jie & WU Shiheng) (f; default)
 Group winners: Great Britain (Paul & Steven Dixon, Finnian Gavin, Jesse Heskett) (m) / China (DUAN Yushan, JI Qiuqiong & LIU Jieyu) (f)
 Mixed pair winners: Portugal (Carolina Dias & Joao Martins)
 September 8–10: FIG World Cup #4 in Lisbon
 Pair winners: Belarus (Artsiom Yashchanka & Aliaksei Zayats) (m) / Belgium (Noemie Lammertyn & Lore Vanden Berghe) (f)
 Group winners: Israel (Lidar Dana, Yannay Kalfa, Efi Efraim Sach, & Daniel Uralevitch) (m) / Russia (Polina Galanova, Viktoriia Kudriavtseva & Alina Petrova) (f)
 Mixed pair winners: Portugal (Carolina Dias & Joao Martins)
 September 17–19: 2017 Asian Acrobatic Gymnastics Championships in Almaty
 Pair winners: North Korea (KONG Yong Won & RI Hyo Song) (m) / North Korea (Jong Kum-hwa & PYON Yun Ae) (f)
 Group winners: China (FU Zhi, GUO Pei, JIANG Heng, & ZHANG Junshuo) (m) / Kazakhstan (Alyona Bavsunovskaya, Saida Burkit, & Polina Slastenko) (f; default)
 Mixed pair winners: Kazakhstan (Dmitriy Fedkovich & Angelina Yanitskaya) 
 October 13–15: 2017 Pan American Acrobatic Gymnastics Championships in Daytona Beach
 Pair winners: United States (Emily Davis & Aubrey Rosilier)
 Mixed pair winners: United States (Tiffani Williams & Axl Osborne)
 Group finals winners: Brazil (Dos Rodrigues Florentino & Alexa Reis de Freitas)
 October 19–22: 2017 European Acrobatics Championships in Rzeszów
 Russia won both the gold and overall medal tallies.

Aerobic gymnastics
 April 22 & 23: FIG Suzuki World Cup 2017 in Tokyo
 Individual winners: Mizuki Saito (m) / Riri Kitazume (f)
 Mixed pair winners: Spain (Vicente Lli & Sara Moreno)
 Trio winners: Japan (Takumi Kanai, Riri Kitazume, & Mizuki Saito)
 Group winners: China (JIANG Shuai, LI Lingxiao, LI Qi. PAN Lixi & XU Xuesong)
 May 26–28: FIG World Cup 2017 in Cantanhede
 Individual winners: Daniel Bali (m) / Riri Kitazume (f)
 Mixed pair winners: Spain (Vicente Lli & Sara Moreno)
 Trio winners: Russia (Elena Ivanova, Ekaterina Pykhtova, & Anastasiia Ziubina)
 Group winners: Hungary (Daniel Bali, Balazs Farkas, Dora Hegyi, Fanni Mazacs, & Panna Szollosi)
 September 15–17: 2017 Asian Aerobic Gymnastics Championships in Ulaanbaatar
 Individual winners: PAN Lixi (m) / Riri Kitazume (f)
 Mixed pair winners: China (WANG Ke & WANG Xinyu)
 Trio winners: Vietnam (Viet Anh Nguyen, Ngoc Thuy Vi Tran, & Hoai An Vuong)
 Group winners: Vietnam
 September 22–24: 2017 Aerobic Gymnastics European Championships in Ancona
 Individual winners: Daniel Bali (m) / Belen Guillemot (f)
 Mixed pair winners: Spain (Sara Moreno & Vicente Lli)
 Trio winners: Romania (Gabriel Bocser, Andreea Bogati, & Marian Brotei)
 Group winners: Romania
 Step winners: Russia
 Aerodance winners: Russia
 October 27–29: 2017 Pan American Aerobic Gymnastics Championships in Bogotá
 Individual winners: Iván Veloz (m) / Daiana Nanzer (f)
 Mixed pair winners: Brazil (Lucas Barbosa & Tamires Silva)
 Trio winners: Argentina (Florencia Cagnola, Catalina Juri, & Rocio Veliz)
 Group winners: Argentina
 Aerodance winners: Mexico

Artistic gymnastics

 February 22–25: FIG World Cup 2017 No. 1 in Melbourne
 Floor winners: Kenzō Shirai (m) / Emily Little (f)
 Vault winners: Kenzō Shirai (m) / Wang Yan (f)
 Men's horizontal bar winner: Kenzō Shirai
 Men's parallel bars winner: ZOU Jingyuan
 Men's pommel horse winner: Krisztián Berki
 Men's rings winner: WU Guanhua
 Women's beam winner: Liu Tingting
 Women's uneven bars winner: Liu Tingting
 March 4: FIG American Cup Individual All-Around World Cup 2017 (#1) in Newark, New Jersey
 All-Around winners: Yul Moldauer (m) / Ragan Smith (f)
 March 16–19: FIG World Cup 2017 AGF Trophy (#2) in Baku
 Floor winners: Tomas Kuzmickas (m) / Cătălina Ponor (f)
 Vault winners: Christopher Remkes (m) / Oksana Chusovitina (f)
 Men's horizontal bar winner: Naoto Hayasaka 
 Men's parallel bars winner: LIU Rongbing
 Men's pommel horse winner: WENG Hao
 Men's rings winner: Eleftherios Petrounias
 Women's beam winner: Cătălina Ponor
 Women's Uneven bars winner: Diana Varinska
 March 18 & 19: FIG EnBW DTB-Pokal Individual All-Around World Cup 2017 (#2) in Stuttgart
 All-Around winners: Oleg Vernyayev (m) / Tabea Alt (f)
 March 22–25: FIG World Cup 2017 No. 2 in Doha
 Floor winners: TANG Chia-Hung (m) / Liu Tingting (f)
 Vault winners: Lê Thánh Tung / Oksana Chusovitina (f)
 Men's horizontal bar winner: XIAO Ruoteng
 Men's parallel bars winner: ZOU Jingyuan
 Men's pommel horse winner: Krisztián Berki
 Men's rings winner: Artur Tovmasyan
 Women's beam winner: Liu Tingting
 Women's uneven bars winner: Luo Huan
 April 8: FIG Individual All-Around World Cup 2017 (#3) in London
 All-Around winners: Oleg Vernyayev (m) / Tabea Alt (f)
 April 19–23: 2017 European Artistic Gymnastics Championships in Cluj-Napoca
 All-Around winners: Oleg Vernyayev (m) / Ellie Downie (f)
 Floor winners: Marian Drăgulescu (m) / Angelina Melnikova (f)
 Vault winners: Artur Dalaloyan (m) / Coline Devillard (f)
 Men's horizontal bar winner: Pablo Brägger
 Men's parallel bars winner: Oleg Vernyayev
 Men's pommel horse winner: David Belyavskiy
 Men's rings winner: Eleftherios Petrounias
 Women's beam winner: Cătălina Ponor
 Women's uneven bars winner: Nina Derwael
 May 12–14: FIG World Challenge Cup 2017 No. 1 in Koper
 Floor winners: Eddie Penev (m) / Carina Kroell (f)
 Vault winners: Andrey Medvedev (m) / Rebeca Andrade (f)
 Men's horizontal bar winner: Tin Srbic
 Men's parallel bars winner: Donnell Whittenburg
 Men's pommel horse winner: Sašo Bertoncelj
 Men's rings winner: Arthur Zanetti
 Women's beam winner: Larisa Iordache
 Women's uneven bars winner: Larisa Iordache
 May 16–21: 2017 Asian Artistic Gymnastics Championships in Bangkok
 China won both the gold and overall medal tallies.
 May 18–21: FIG World Challenge Cup 2017 No. 2 in Osijek
 Floor winners: Kirill Prokopev (m) / Thais Santos (f)
 Vault winners: Audrys Nin Reyes (m) / Boglárka Dévai (f)
 Men's horizontal bar winner: Tin Srbic
 Men's parallel bars winner: Jossimar Calvo
 Men's pommel horse winner: Rhys McClenaghan
 Men's rings winner: Arthur Zanetti
 Women's beam winner: Thais Santos
 Women's uneven bars winner: Lilia Akhaimova
 September 1–3: FIG Individual Apparatus World Challenge Cup in Varna
 Floor winners: Tomás González (m) / Thais Santos (f)
 Vault winners: Ihor Radivilov (m) / Rebeca Andrade (f)
 Men's horizontal bar winner: Caio Souza
 Men's parallel bars winner: Petro Pakhnyuk
 Men's pommel horse winner: Andrey Likhovitskiy
 Men's rings winner: Ihor Radivilov
 Women's beam winner: Daniele Hypólito
 Women's uneven bars winner: Rebeca Andrade
 September 8–10: FIG World Challenge Cup 2017 #3 in Szombathely
 Floor winners: Fuya Maeno (m) / Brooklyn Moors (f)
 Vault winners: Marian Drăgulescu (m) / Marina Nekrasova (f)
 Men's horizontal bar winner: Jossimar Calvo
 Men's parallel bars winner: Kazuma Kaya
 Men's pommel horse winner: Kazuma Kaya
 Men's rings winner: İbrahim Çolak
 Women's beam winner: Cătălina Ponor
 Women's uneven bars winner: Jonna Adlerteg
 September 16 & 17: FIG World Challenge Cup–20th Internationaux de France 2017 (#4) in Paris
 Floor winners: Jorge Vega Lopez (m) / Claudia Fragapane (f)
 Vault winners: Audrys Nin Reyes (m) / Coline Devillard (f)
 Men's horizontal bar winner: Epke Zonderland
 Men's parallel bars winner: Oleg Vernyayev
 Men's pommel horse winner: Takaaki Sugino
 Men's rings winner: Eleftherios Petrounias
 Women's beam winner: Larisa Iordache
 Women's uneven bars winner: Nina Derwael
 October 2–8: 2017 Artistic Gymnastics World Championships in Montreal
 All-Around winners: Xiao Ruoteng (m) / Morgan Hurd (f)
 Floor winners: Kenzō Shirai (m) / Mai Murakami (f)
 Vault winners: Kenzō Shirai (m) / Maria Paseka (f)
 Men's horizontal bar winner: Tin Srbić
 Men's parallel bars winner: ZOU Jingyuan
 Men's pommel horse winner: Max Whitlock
 Men's rings winner: Eleftherios Petrounias
 Women's beam winner: Pauline Schäfer
 Women's uneven bars winner: Fan Yilin
 November 23–26: 42nd Turnier der Meister FIG Individual Apparatus World Cup in Cottbus
 Floor winners: Rok Klavora (m) / Lilia Akhaimova (f)
 Vault winners: Keisuke Asato (m) / Oksana Chusovitina (f)
 Men's horizontal bar winner: Andreas Bretschneider
 Men's parallel bars winner: TAN Di
 Men's pommel horse winner: WANG Junwen
 Men's rings winner: Ihor Radivilov
 Women's beam winner: WANG Cenyu
 Women's uneven bars winner: Elisabeth Seitz

Rhythmic gymnastics
 February 15–20: Grand Prix No. 1 in Moscow
 All-Around winner: Dina Averina
 Hoop winner: Dina Averina
 Ball winner: Aleksandra Soldatova
 Clubs winner: Dina Averina
 Ribbon winner: Dina Averina
 Junior individual winner: Lala Kramarenko
 March 17–19: Grand Prix #2 in Kyiv
 All-Around winner: Polina Khonina
 Hoop winner: Victoria Veinberg Filanovsky
 Junior hoop winner: Krystyna Pohranychna
 Ball winner: Katrin Taseva
 Clubs winner: Iuliia Bravikova
 Junior clubs winner: Krystyna Pohranychna
 Ribbon winner: Iuliia Bravikova
 March 25 & 26: Grand Prix No. 3 in Thiais
 All-Around winner: Dina Averina
 Hoop winner: Dina Averina
 Ball winner: Dina Averina
 Clubs winner: Dina Averina
 Ribbon winner: Iuliia Bravikova
 Groups 3 ball & 2 ropes winners: Azerbaijan
 Groups 5 hoops winners: Azerbaijan
 March 30 – April 2: Grand Prix Marbella in Marbella
 All-Around winner: Aleksandra Soldatova
 Ball winner: Aleksandra Soldatova 
 Hoop winner: Aleksandra Soldatova 
 Clubs winner: Aleksandra Soldatova 
 Ribbon winner: Aleksandra Soldatova 
 Junior all-round winner: Lala Kramarenko
 Junior hoop winner: Lala Kramarenko
 Junior ball winner: Lala Kramarenko
 Junior clubs winner: Anastasia Sergeeva
 Junior ribbon winner: Anastasia Sergeeva
 Teams winners: Russia (Polina Shmatko, Lala Kramarenko)
 April 7–9: FIG World Cup 2017 No. 1 in Pesaro
 All-Around winner: Aleksandra Soldatova 
 Hoop winner: Aleksandra Soldatova
 Ball winner: Dina Averina
 Clubs winner: Dina Averina
 Ribbon winner: Dina Averina
 Group all-round winners: Bulgaria 
 5-hoop group winners: Italy
 3-ball & 2-rope group winners: Italy 
 April 21–23: FIG World Cup 2017 #2 in Tashkent
 All-Around winner: Dina Averina
 Hoop winner: Arina Averina
 Ball winner: Arina Averina
 Clubs winner: Dina Averina
 Ribbon winner: Arina Averina
 Group All-Around winners: Russia
 5-hoop group winners: Russia
 3-ball & 2-rope group winners: Bulgaria
 April 28–30: FIG World Cup 2017 #3 in Baku
 All-Around winner: Arina Averina
 Hoop winner: Arina Averina
 Ball winner: Aleksandra Soldatova
 Clubs winner: Victoria Veinberg Filanovsky
 Ribbon winner: Neviana Vladinova
 Group All-Around winners: Bulgaria
 5-hoop group winners: Italy 
 3-ball & 2-rope group winners: Ukraine
 May 5–7: FIG World Cup 2017 #4 in Sofia
 All-Around winner: Neviana Vladinova
 Hoop winner: Neviana Vladinova
 Ball winner: Neviana Vladinova
 Clubs winner: Alina Harnasko
 Ribbon winner: Neviana Vladinova
 Group All-Around winners: Bulgaria
 5-hoop group winners: Ukraine
 3-ball & 2-rope group winners: Ukraine
 May 12–14: FIG World Challenge Cup 2017 #1 in Portimão
 All-Around winner: Iuliia Bravikova
 Hoop winner: Victoria Veinberg Filanovsky
 Ball winner: Victoria Veinberg Filanovsky
 Clubs winner: Elizaveta Lugovskikh
 Ribbon winner: Victoria Veinberg Filanovsky
 Group All-Around winners: Italy
 5-hoop group winners: Italy
 3-ball & 2-rope group winners: Italy
 May 19–21: 2017 European Rhythmic Gymnastics Championships in Budapest
 Hoop winner: Dina Averina
 Ball winner: Arina Averina
 Clubs winner: Arina Averina
 Ribbon winner: Dina Averina
 Group All-Around winners: Russia
 June 2–4: FIG World Challenge Cup 2017 #2 in Guadalajara, Castilla-La Mancha
 Hoop winner: Ekaterina Selezneva
 Ball winner: Polina Khonina
 Clubs winner: Polina Khonina
 Ribbon winner: Ekaterina Selezneva
 Group All-Around winners: Russia
 5-hoop group winners: Japan
 3-ball & 2-rope group winners: Russia
 June 16–18: Grand Prix #4 in Saint Petersburg
 June 22–26: Grand Prix No. 5 in Holon
 June 24–27: 2017 Asian Senior & Junior Rhythmic Gymnastics Championships in Astana
 Senior All-Around winner: Anastasiya Serdyukova
 Senior hoop winner: Sabina Ashirbayeva
 Senior ball winner: Sabina Ashirbayeva
 Senior clubs winner: Anastasiya Serdyukova
 Senior ribbon winner: Anastasiya Serdyukova
 Senior team winners: Kazakhstan
 Senior group All-Around winners: Japan
 Senior 5-hoop group winners: Japan
 Senior 3-ball & 2-rope group winners: Japan
 July 7–9: FIG Berlin Masters World Challenge Cup 2017 in Germany
 All-Around winner: Katsiaryna Halkina
 Hoop winner: Ekaterina Selezneva
 Ball winner: Ekaterina Selezneva
 Clubs winner: Iuliia Bravikova
 Ribbon winner: Katsiaryna Halkina
 Group All-Around winners: Russia
 5-hoop group winners: Russia
 3-ball & 2-rope group winners: Russia
 August 5 & 6: FIG World Challenge Cup 2017 – BSB Bank in Minsk
 All-Around winner: Aleksandra Soldatova
 Hoop winner: Neviana Vladinova
 Ball winner: Katsiaryna Halkina
 Clubs winner: Iuliia Bravikova
 Ribbon winner: Iuliia Bravikova
 Group All-Around winners: Italy
 5-hoop group winners: Bulgaria
 3-ball & 2-rope group winners: Belarus
 August 11–13: FIG World Challenge Cup 2017 #3 in Kazan
 All-Around winner: Dina Averina
 Hoop winner: Dina Averina
 Ball winner: Arina Averina
 Clubs winner: Dina Averina
 Ribbon winner: Arina Averina
 Group All-Around winners: Russia
 5-hoop group winners: Russia
 3-ball & 2-rope group winners: Russia
 August 30 – September 3: 2017 World Rhythmic Gymnastics Championships in Pesaro
 All-Around winner: Dina Averina
 Hoop winner: Dina Averina
 Ball winner: Arina Averina
 Clubs winner: Dina Averina
 Ribbon winner: Arina Averina
 Group All-Around winners: Russia
 5-hoop group winners: Italy
 3-ball & 2-rope group winners: Russia
 October 13–15: 2017 Pan American Rhythmic Gymnastics Championships in Daytona Beach, Florida
 All-Around winner: Evita Griskenas
 Hoop winner: Evita Griskenas
 Ball winner: Evita Griskenas
 Clubs winner: Evita Griskenas
 Ribbon winner: Evita Griskenas
 Group All-Around winners: Brazil
 5-hoop group winners: United States
 3-ball & 2-rope group winners: Brazil
 Team winners: United States
 October 19–23: Grand Prix #6 in Brno

Trampolining/Tumbling
 February 18 & 19: FIG World Cup 2017 No. 1 in Baku
 Individual winners: Mikhail Melnik (m) / Susana Kochesok (f)
 Synchronized winners: Kazakhstan (Pirmammad Aliyev & Danil Mussabayev) (m) / Belarus (Hanna Harchonak & Tatsiana Piatrenia) (f)
 Tumbling winners: Grigory Noskov (m) / Anna Korobeinikova (f)
 August 18 & 19: FIG World Cup 2017 #2 in Minsk
 Individual winners: Uladzislau Hancharou (m) / Yana Pavlova (f)
 Synchronized winners: Belarus (Mikita Ilyinykh & Artsiom Zhuk) (m) / Belarus (Hanna Harchonak & Maryia Makharynskaya) (f)
 September 29 & 30: FIG World Cup 2017 #3 in Loulé
 Individual winners: Gao Lei (m) / Yana Pavlova (f)
 Synchronized winners: Belarus (Uladzislau Hancharou & Aleh Rabtsau) (m) / Japan (Chisato Doihata & Reina Satake) (f)
 Tumbling winners: Mikhail Malkin (m) / JIA Fangfang (f)
 October 7 & 8: FIG World Cup 2017 #4 in Valladolid
 Individual winners: Dong Dong (m) / ZHU Xueying (f)
 Synchronized winners: Great Britain (Nathan Bailey & Luke Strong) (m) / Belarus (Maryia Makharynskaya & Tatsiana Piatrenia) (f)
 Tumbling winners: Maxim Shlyakin (m) / Anna Korobeinikova (f)
 November 9–12: 2017 Trampoline World Championships in Sofia
 China won the gold medal tally. China and Russia won 9 overall medals each.

References

External links
 FIG – Fédération Internationale de Gymnastique (International Federation of Gymnastics)

 
Gymnastics by year